Scientific modelling is a scientific activity, the aim of which is to make a particular part or feature of the world easier to understand, define, quantify, visualize, or simulate by referencing it to existing and usually commonly accepted knowledge. It requires selecting and identifying relevant aspects of a situation in the real world and then developing a model to replicate a system with those features. Different types of models may be used for different purposes, such as conceptual models to better understand, operational models to operationalize, mathematical models to quantify, computational models to simulate, and graphical models to visualize the subject. 

Modelling is an essential and inseparable part of many scientific disciplines, each of which has its own ideas about specific types of modelling. The following was said by John von Neumann.

There is also an increasing attention to scientific modelling in fields such as science education, philosophy of science, systems theory, and knowledge visualization. There is a growing collection of methods, techniques and meta-theory about all kinds of specialized scientific modelling.

Overview 

A scientific model seeks to represent empirical objects, phenomena, and physical processes in a logical and objective way. All models are in simulacra, that is, simplified reflections of reality that, despite being approximations, can be extremely useful. Building and disputing models is fundamental to the scientific enterprise. Complete and true representation may be impossible, but scientific debate often concerns which is the better model for a given task, e.g., which is the more accurate climate model for seasonal forecasting.

Attempts to formalize the principles of the empirical sciences use an interpretation to model reality, in the same way logicians axiomatize the principles of logic. The aim of these attempts is to construct a formal system that will not produce theoretical consequences that are contrary to what is found in reality. Predictions or other statements drawn from such a formal system mirror or map the real world only insofar as these scientific models are true.<ref name="tcarotmimanass">Leo Apostel (1961). "Formal study of models". In: The Concept and the Role of the Model in Mathematics and Natural and Social. Edited by Hans Freudenthal. Springer. pp. 8–9 (Source)],</ref>

For the scientist, a model is also a way in which the human thought processes can be amplified. For instance, models that are rendered in software allow scientists to leverage computational power to simulate, visualize, manipulate and gain intuition about the entity, phenomenon, or process being represented. Such computer models are in silico. Other types of scientific models are in vivo (living models, such as laboratory rats) and in vitro (in glassware, such as tissue culture).

 Basics 

Modelling as a substitute for direct measurement and experimentation
Models are typically used when it is either impossible or impractical to create experimental conditions in which scientists can directly measure outcomes. Direct measurement of outcomes under controlled conditions (see Scientific method) will always be more reliable than modeled estimates of outcomes.

Within  modeling and simulation, a model is a task-driven, purposeful simplification and abstraction of a perception of reality, shaped by physical, legal, and cognitive constraints. It is task-driven because a model is captured with a certain question or task in mind. Simplifications leave all the known and observed entities and their relation out that are not important for the task. Abstraction aggregates information that is important but not needed in the same detail as the object of interest. Both activities, simplification, and abstraction, are done purposefully. However, they are done based on a perception of reality. This perception is already a model in itself, as it comes with a physical constraint. There are also constraints on what we are able to legally observe with our current tools and methods, and cognitive constraints that limit what we are able to explain with our current theories. This model comprises the concepts, their behavior, and their relations informal form and is often referred to as a conceptual model. In order to execute the model, it needs to be implemented as a computer simulation. This requires more choices, such as numerical approximations or the use of heuristics. Despite all these epistemological and computational constraints, simulation has been recognized as the third pillar of scientific methods: theory building, simulation, and experimentation.

Simulation
A simulation is a way to implement the model, often employed when the model is too complex for the analytical solution. A steady-state simulation provides information about the system at a specific instant in time (usually at equilibrium, if such a state exists).  A dynamic simulation provides information over time. A simulation shows how a particular object or phenomenon will behave. Such a simulation can be useful for testing, analysis, or training in those cases where real-world systems or concepts can be represented by models.

Structure
Structure is a fundamental and sometimes intangible notion covering the recognition, observation, nature, and stability of patterns and relationships of entities. From a child's verbal description of a snowflake, to the detailed scientific analysis of the properties of magnetic fields, the concept of structure is an essential foundation of nearly every mode of inquiry and discovery in science, philosophy, and art.

Systems
A system is a set of interacting or interdependent entities, real or abstract, forming an integrated whole. In general, a system is a construct or collection of different elements that together can produce results not obtainable by the elements alone.  The concept of an 'integrated whole' can also be stated in terms of a system embodying a set of relationships which are differentiated from relationships of the set to other elements, and form relationships between an element of the set and elements not a part of the relational regime.  There are two types of system models: 1) discrete in which the variables change instantaneously at separate points in time and, 2) continuous where the state variables change continuously with respect to time.

Generating a model
Modelling is the process of generating a model as a conceptual representation of some phenomenon. Typically a model will deal with only some aspects of the phenomenon in question, and two models of the same phenomenon may be essentially different—that is to say, that the differences between them comprise more than just a simple renaming of components.

Such differences may be due to differing requirements of the model's end users, or to conceptual or aesthetic differences among the modelers and to contingent decisions made during the modelling process. Considerations that may influence the structure of a model might be the modeler's preference for a reduced ontology, preferences regarding statistical models versus deterministic models, discrete versus continuous time, etc. In any case, users of a model need to understand the assumptions made that are pertinent to its validity for a given use.

Building a model requires abstraction.  Assumptions are used in modelling in order to specify the domain of application of the model. For example, the special theory of relativity assumes an inertial frame of reference. This assumption was contextualized and further explained by the general theory of relativity. A model makes accurate predictions when its assumptions are valid, and might well not make accurate predictions when its assumptions do not hold. Such assumptions are often the point with which older theories are succeeded by new ones (the general theory of relativity works in non-inertial reference frames as well).

Evaluating a model

A model is evaluated first and foremost by its consistency to empirical data; any model inconsistent with reproducible observations must be modified or rejected. One way to modify the model is by restricting the domain over which it is credited with having high validity. A case in point is Newtonian physics, which is highly useful except for the very small, the very fast, and the very massive phenomena of the universe. However, a fit to empirical data alone is not sufficient for a model to be accepted as valid.  Factors important in evaluating a model include:
 Ability to explain past observations
 Ability to predict future observations
 Cost of use, especially in combination with other models
 Refutability, enabling estimation of the degree of confidence in the model
 Simplicity, or even aesthetic appeal
People may attempt to quantify the evaluation of a model using a utility function.

Visualization
Visualization is any technique for creating images, diagrams, or animations to communicate a message. Visualization through visual imagery has been an effective way to communicate both abstract and concrete ideas since the dawn of man. Examples from history include cave paintings, Egyptian hieroglyphs, Greek geometry, and Leonardo da Vinci's revolutionary methods of technical drawing for engineering and scientific purposes.

Space mapping
Space mapping refers to a methodology that employs a "quasi-global" modelling formulation to link companion "coarse" (ideal or low-fidelity) with "fine" (practical or high-fidelity) models of different complexities. In engineering optimization, space mapping aligns (maps) a very fast coarse model with its related expensive-to-compute fine model so as to avoid direct expensive optimization of the fine model. The alignment process iteratively refines a "mapped" coarse model (surrogate model).

 Types 

 Analogical modelling
 Assembly modelling
 Catastrophe modelling
 Choice modelling
 Climate model
 Computational model
 Continuous modelling
 Data modelling
 Discrete modelling
 Document modelling
 Econometric model
 Economic model
 Ecosystem model

 Empirical modelling
 Enterprise modelling
 Futures studies
 Geologic modelling
 Goal modelling
 Homology modelling
 Hydrogeology
 Hydrography
 Hydrologic modelling
 Informative modelling
 Macroscale modelling
 Mathematical modelling

 Metabolic network modelling
 Microscale modelling
 Modelling biological systems
 Modelling in epidemiology
 Molecular modelling
 Multicomputational model
 Multiscale modelling
 NLP modelling
 Phenomenological modelling
 Predictive intake modelling
 Predictive modelling
 Scale modelling
 Simulation

 Software modelling
 Solid modelling
 Space mapping
 Statistical model
 Stochastic modelling (insurance)
 Surrogate model
 System architecture
 System dynamics
 Systems modelling
 System-level modelling and simulation
 Water quality modelling

 Applications 
Modelling and simulation

One application of scientific modelling is the field of modelling and simulation, generally referred to as "M&S".  M&S has a spectrum of applications which range from concept development and analysis, through experimentation, measurement, and verification, to disposal analysis.  Projects and programs may use hundreds of different simulations, simulators and model analysis tools.

The figure shows how modelling and simulation is used as a central part of an integrated program in a defence capability development process.

 See also 
 Abductive reasoning
 All models are wrong
 Data and information visualization
 Heuristic
 Inverse problem
 Scientific visualization
 Statistical model

 References 

 Further reading 
Nowadays there are some 40 magazines about scientific modelling which offer all kinds of international forums. Since the 1960s there is a strongly growing number of books and magazines about specific forms of scientific modelling. There is also a lot of discussion about scientific modelling in the philosophy-of-science literature. A selection:
 Rainer Hegselmann, Ulrich Müller and Klaus Troitzsch (eds.) (1996). Modelling and Simulation in the Social Sciences from the Philosophy of Science Point of View. Theory and Decision Library. Dordrecht: Kluwer.
 Paul Humphreys (2004). Extending Ourselves: Computational Science, Empiricism, and Scientific Method. Oxford: Oxford University Press.
 Johannes Lenhard, Günter Küppers and Terry Shinn (Eds.) (2006) "Simulation: Pragmatic Constructions of Reality", Springer Berlin.
 Tom Ritchey (2012). "Outline for a Morphology of Modelling Methods:  Contribution to a General Theory of Modelling". In: Acta Morphologica Generalis, Vol 1. No 1. pp. 1–20.
 William Silvert (2001). "Modelling as a Discipline". In: Int. J. General Systems. Vol. 30(3), pp. 261.
 Sergio Sismondo and Snait Gissis (eds.) (1999). Modeling and Simulation. Special Issue of Science in Context 12.
 Eric Winsberg (2018) "Philosophy and Climate Science" Cambridge: Cambridge University Press
 Eric Winsberg (2010) "Science in the Age of Computer Simulation" Chicago: University of Chicago Press
 Eric Winsberg (2003). "Simulated Experiments: Methodology for a Virtual World". In: Philosophy of Science 70: 105–125.
 Tomáš Helikar, Jim A Rogers (2009). "ChemChains: a platform for simulation and analysis of biochemical networks aimed to laboratory scientists". BioMed Central.

 External links 

Models. Entry in the Internet Encyclopedia of PhilosophyModels in Science. Entry in the Stanford Encyclopedia of Philosophy''
The World as a Process: Simulations in the Natural and Social Sciences, in: R. Hegselmann et al. (eds.), Modelling and Simulation in the Social Sciences from the Philosophy of Science Point of View, Theory and Decision Library. Dordrecht: Kluwer 1996, 77-100.
Research in simulation and modelling of various physical systems
Modelling Water Quality Information Center, U.S. Department of Agriculture
Ecotoxicology & Models
A Morphology of Modelling Methods. Acta Morphologica Generalis, Vol 1. No 1. pp. 1–20.

 
Conceptual modelling
Epistemology of science
Interpretation (philosophy)

it:Teoria#Modelli